The 2019 United States Women's Curling Championship was held from February 9 to 16 in Kalamazoo, Michigan. It was held in conjunction with the 2019 United States Men's Curling Championship.

Teams 
Eight teams qualified to participate in the 2019 national championship.

Round-robin standings 
Final round-robin standings.

Round-robin results 
All draw times are listed in Eastern Standard Time (UTC−7).

Draw 1 
Sunday, February 10, 12:00pm

Draw 2 
Sunday, February 10, 8:00pm

Draw 3 
Monday, February 11, 2:00pm

Draw 4 
Tuesday, February 12, 9:00am

Draw 5 
Tuesday, February 12, 7:00pm

Draw 6 
Wednesday, February 13, 2:00pm

Draw 7 
Thursday, February 14, 11:00am

Playoffs

1 vs. 2 
Friday, February 15, 1:00pm

3 vs. 4 
Friday, February 15, 1:00pm

Semifinal 
Friday, February 15, 7:00pm

Final  
Saturday, February 16, 11:00 am ET

References

External links 
 USA Curling - 2019 Women's Curling National Championship

United States National Curling Championships
Women's curling competitions in the United States
Curling in Michigan
Sports in Kalamazoo, Michigan
Curling, United States Women's
Curling, United States Women's
Curling, United States Women's